Kerstin Monica Äijä-Lenndin (born 17 February 1963) is a retired Swedish alpine skier who competed in the 1988 Winter Olympics.

She was born in Abisko in 1963.

References

External links
 
 

1963 births
Living people
Swedish female alpine skiers
Olympic alpine skiers of Sweden
Alpine skiers at the 1988 Winter Olympics
20th-century Swedish women